IKC may refer to:

 Imperial Klingon Cruiser, the ship prefix for Klingon starships in the Star Trek fictional universe
 Indigenous Knowledge Centre